Sengwa River is a river in Zimbabwe.

As of 2012, this river is now dead.

Rivers of Zimbabwe
Tributaries of the Zambezi River